Eynaa is a 2004 Maldivian horror film directed by Abdul Faththaah.  Produced by Aslam Rasheed under Slam Studio, the film stars Sheela Najeeb, Mohamed Manik, Ahmed Shah, Khadheeja Ibrahim Didi, Ibrahim Jihad, Nashidha Mohamed and Hassan Afeef in pivotal roles.

Plot
On 12 Shawwal 1420, a group of six colleagues go on a picnic to an uninhabited island rumored to be cursed where horrifying incidents occur for the 13th, 14th and 15th of each month. The island was restricted from visiting for the past ten years, but permitted for a special request from Fasee (Ibrahim Jihad). On arrival they are welcomed by Shathir, a notable historian, who came to the island to prepare a thesis for his PhD. After refreshing, the group dispersed around the island exploring and enjoying the view. The group includes four lovers; Neena (Khadheeja Ibrahim Didi) and Riyaz (Ahmed Shah), Fasee and Nasra (Nashidha Mohamed) and two exes; Nihan (Mohamed Manik) and Malakaa (Sheela Najeeb).

During the stay, they met with some unusual incidents which the group differs to believe; Malakaa presumably seeing a human skull while Neena and Riyaz felt a strange cooling breeze rushed over them after they had an intimate moment. After dinner, Riyaz and Neena planned to scare rest of the group by wearing a mask. The plan was going smooth till Neena fells upon the same skull Malakaa mentioned and she failed to remove the mask off her face. She was killed by the spirit and the group splits into two searching for her. Riyaz and Shathir finds Neena hanging on tree with the mask on. The duo ran for their lives when the spirit pulled Riyaz's leg and drowned him into the sea. Shathir was able to save himself since he was wearing an amulet on his waist. He recalls having the knowledge that the spirit has a connection with the moon; once a cloud shadows over the moon, her supernatural powers strengthen.

Shathir went back to his tent to fetch his research documents. Quarrel within the group arises when Nihan suspects Shathir is hiding several facts from them. Shathir informs them that the island was believed to be haunted and the island disappears during this period. The group leave together to search for the skull which Malakaa found. However, the team separates and Fasee and Nasra are ultimately killed. Nihan and Shathir engage in a fight and Nihan breaks Shathir’s amulet. Shathir snatches the amulet back from him and breaks Nihan's leg. Shathir discovers the skull and finds out the truth about the island; a man killed his wife when she found out about his extramarital affairs and buried her on the island. Shathir is then murdered while holding the skull. Malakaa and Nihan locate a wood pallet and they try to swim off but Nihan falls off the pallet and dies while Malakaa makes it off the shore. She later awakens with no prior memories, lying on the pallet in the middle of the sea.

Cast 
 Sheela Najeeb as Malakaa
 Mohamed Manik as Nihan
 Ahmed Shah as Riyaz
 Khadheeja Ibrahim Didi as Neena
 Ibrahim Jihad as Fasee
 Nashidha Mohamed as Nasra
 Hassan Afeef as Shathir
 Mariyam Nisha as Aani
 Mariyam Shakeela
 Ali Ahmed (Special appearance)
 Mohamed Afrah (Special appearance)
 Fauziyya Hassan as Nasra's mother

Soundtrack

Accolades

References

2004 films
Maldivian horror films
2004 horror films
Films directed by Abdul Faththaah